Circle packing in a circle is a two-dimensional packing problem with the objective of packing unit circles into the smallest possible larger circle.

Table of solutions, 1 ≤ n ≤ 20
If more than one equivalent solution exists, all are shown.

Special cases
Only 26 optimal packings are thought to be rigid (with no circles able to "rattle"). Numbers in bold are prime:
 Proven for n = 1, 2, 3, 4, 5, 6, 7, 10, 11, 12, 13, 19
 Conjectured for n = 14, 15, 16, 17, 18, 22, 23, 27, 30, 31, 33, 37, 61, 91
Of these, solutions for n = 2, 3, 4, 7, 19, and 37 achieve a packing density greater than any smaller number > 1. (Higher density records all have rattles.)

See also
Disk covering problem
Square packing in a circle

References

External links 
Mathematical analysis of 2D packing of circles (2022). H C Rajpoot from arXiv
 "The best known packings of equal circles in a circle (complete up to N = 2600)"
 "Online calculator for "How many circles can you get in order to minimize the waste?"

Circle packing